Lusitanops hyaloides is a species of sea snail, a marine gastropod mollusk in the family Raphitomidae.

Description
The length of the shell attains 17 mm.

The shell of this species is pyramidal in shape, and rounded, with a pronounced siphonal mouth.

Distribution
This species is found in the Western Mediterranean. and off the Azores.

References

 Dautzenberg, 1925) Dautzenberg P. (1925). Mollusques nouveaux provenant des croisières du Prince Albert Ier de Monaco. Bulletin de l'Institut Océanographique de Monaco 457: 1-12

External links
 
 Intergovernmental Oceanographic Commission (IOC) of UNESCO. The Ocean Biogeographic Information System (OBIS)
 Gastropods.com: Lusitanops hyaloides

hyaloides
Gastropods described in 1925